The Virgo II Groups, also known as the Virgo II Cloud, Virgo Southern Extension, or the Virgo S Cloud, are a series of at least 100 galactic clusters and individual galaxies stretching approximately  off the southern edge of the Virgo Supercluster.

These clusters include:
M61 Group:
IC 3474
M61 (NGC 4303)
NGC 4255
NGC 4420
NGC 4496A
NGC 4517A
NGC 4527
NGC 4533
NGC 4536
NGC 4581
NGC 4599
NGC 4632
PGC 40951
UGC 7387
UGC 7522
UGC 7612
UGC 7780
NGC 4030 Group:
NGC 4030
UGC 6970
UGC 7000
NGC 4179 Group:
NGC 4116
NGC 4123
NGC 4179
UGC 7035
NGC 4697 Group:
IC 3908
MCG-1-33-1
MCG-1-33-3
MCG-1-33-11
MCG-1-33-33
MCG-1-33-59
MCG-1-33-61
MCG-1-33-82
NGC 4697
NGC 4731
NGC 4775
NGC 4941
NGC 4948
NGC 4948A
NGC 4951
NGC 4958
UGCA 310
NGC 4699 Group:
MCG-2-33-15
MCG-2-33-47
MCG-1-33-60
MCG-2-33-85
NGC 4699
NGC 4700
NGC 4722
NGC 4742
NGC 4781
NGC 4790
NGC 4802
NGC 4818
NGC 4753 Group:
NGC 4636
NGC 4643
NGC 4688
NGC 4691
NGC 4753
NGC 4771
NGC 4772
NGC 4808
NGC 4845
NGC 4900
NGC 4904
UGC 7824
UGC 7911
UGC 7982
UGC 8041
NGC 4856 Group:
MCG-2-33-82
MCG-2-33-88
MCG-3-33-32
NGC 4856
NGC 4984
NGC 4995 Group:
IC 4212
NGC 4942
NGC 4981
NGC 4995
NGC 5084 Group:
ESO 576-50
NGC 5084
NGC 5087
NGC 5134
Additional galaxies in the group:
M104 (NGC 4594, or the Sombrero Galaxy)
MCG-3-33-30
NGC 4457
NGC 4487
NGC 4504
NGC 4517
NGC 4546
NGC 4586
NGC 4592
NGC 4597
NGC 4665
NGC 4666
NGC 4684
NGC 4701
NGC 5054
NGC 5170
NGC 5247

See also
M96 Group
Leo II Groups
Virgo III Groups

References

Galaxy clusters
Virgo Supercluster